Ludovic Loustau (born 15 August 1973) is a former French international rugby union footballer who played scrum-half in France's Top 14 competition.

Loustau was born in Talence, France.  His first professional club was US Dax. From 1997 until 1999 he played for Stade Français which he won French championship in 1998. After the 1998–99 season, he moved to Bègles he helps it to get in Top 16 in 2001. After the promotion he moved for USA Perpignan where he played during for seasons. 
Loustau has played for France. In July 2004 he was selected for France's Test squad to play the American national teams and made his Test début against the Canucks on 10 July 2004.

Honours
 Stade Français
French Rugby Union Championship/Top 14: 1997–98

References

External links

Living people
French rugby union players
Rugby union scrum-halves
USA Perpignan players
France international rugby union players
1973 births
People from Talence
Sportspeople from Gironde
US Dax players
Stade Français players
CA Bordeaux-Bègles Gironde players
RC Toulonnais players
Lyon OU players